Keith William Dalby is an Australian Anglican bishop, currently serving as the Bishop of The Murray since 2019.

Early life
Dalby was born in the United Kingdom, but returned to South Australia where his parents had married. He spent time in the Northern Territory before joining the Australian Navy where he served for 13 years, 12 as a submariner.

Ordained ministry
Dalby commenced training for the priesthood at St Barnabas College, Adelaide, in 1992, and obtained a Bachelor of Theology degree. He became curate at St Michael's Mitcham in Adelaide before serving as priest at Timboon and Warracknabeal in Victoria in the Diocese of Ballarat from 1997 and Gordon in the Diocese of Sydney from 2004.

Episcopal ministry
In June 2019, Dalby was announced as the fifth diocesan bishop of the Diocese of The Murray in South Australia. He was consecrated as bishop at St Peter's Cathedral, Adelaide, on 16 August 2019 and enthroned as Bishop of The Murray at 17 August 2019 in St John the Baptist Cathedral, Murray Bridge.

Personal life
Dalby is married to Alice and they have five children.

References

21st-century Anglican bishops in Australia
Living people
1960s births
Anglican bishops of The Murray
Moore Theological College alumni